Isaac Fletcher is the name of:

Isaac Fletcher (American politician) (1784–1842), American lawyer and politician
Isaac Fletcher Redfield (1804–1876), American lawyer, judge, and legal scholar
Isaac Fletcher (British politician) (1827–1879), British ironmaster and politician
Isaac Fletcher (footballer) (born 2002), English footballer